The European Health Forum Gastein (EHFG) nicknamed the 'Davos for Public Health' is a non-profit and non-partisan association led by Dr. Clemens Martin Auer (President) and Dorli Kahr-Gottlieb (Secretary General).
The EHFG is the leading health policy conference in Europe. The main objective is to facilitate the establishment of a framework for advising and developing European health policy while recognising the principle of subsidiarity. In doing so, many connections with partners from across all sectors involved in health policy, public health and health care were created. Supported by the European Commission, the Austrian Ministry of Health and many more, the EHFG offers an unparalleled opportunity to exchange information about a broad spectrum of contemporary health issues.

History and Structure

The EHFG was founded in 1998 as a European health policy conference with the aim of providing an discussion platform for the various stakeholders in the field of public health and health care. Since then the EHFG has developed into a key annual event, bringing together politicians, senior decision-makers, representatives of interest groups, and experts coming from:

Government and administration
Business and industry
Civil society and
Science and academia

These four groups of stakeholders with their perspectives constitute the four pillars of the European Health Forum Gastein.
The EHFG attracts yearly approximately 600 delegates, coming from all over Europe and beyond, representing the key stakeholders of the European health policy community.

Objectives

The main objective of the EHFG is to facilitate the establishment of a framework for advising and developing European health policy while recognising the importance of national and regional authorities and decision-making bodies. The EHFG maintains an unparalleled mix of participants including leading country- and EU-level representatives from the areas of health policy, administration, science, business and patient organisations. By focusing on key issues in the European health arena the Forum considers in particular the following areas, tasks and challenges:

Discussion of the main short-term and long-term objectives of the working programme of the European Community, the Member States, accession candidate countries and the regions as well as their implementation, and the further development of European health policy.
Detailed discussion of opportunities for integration of health policy across different policy areas.
Analysis and discussion of the impact of European integration, in particular the Common Market and Economic and Monetary Union on health systems, services and policies.
Evaluation of current developments and their effects on society, health systems, and services, and in particular the changing role of citizens and patients.
Exchange of national and regional experiences in health policy development.

Young Forum Gastein Initiative

The Young Forum Gastein initiative is a joint project of the EHFG and the European Commission (DG Health & Consumers, DG Information Society & Media and DG Research & Innovation) aimed at young researchers and officials from Member States of the European Union and beyond who work in the field of health. The purpose of the initiative is to introduce promising young decision-makers and experts to the Gastein process – bridging the gap between research and policy-making and facilitating learning and networking.

European Health Award

The purpose of the European Health Award is to highlight and reward an initiative covering more than one European country. The project should make a clear and significant contribution to the challenges facing European public health systems, with particular focus on ameliorating disparities in health service provision.

EHFG Venue

Gastein Valley - The Gastein valley lies at the heart of the ‘Hohe Tauern’ nature reserve in Austria, the largest of its kind in Central Europe.

References

Public health organizations
European medical and health organizations